The Children's Bureau may refer to:
 The United States Children's Bureau, a U.S. federal agency created in 1912 to promote the health and well-being of children and mothers.
 The National Children's Bureau, a London-based charity exploring a range of issues involving children.
 The Children's Bureau (Taiwan), an agency under the Ministry of the Interior (Republic of China) for child welfare and protection.